Sean McCahill  (born 1968 in Auckland, New Zealand) is a retired Irish rugby union centre.

McCahill grew up in Auckland and attended St Peter's College where he played rugby. His father was an Irish immigrant who established a profitable road-making and infrastructure business in Auckland, Green and McCahill. Sean McCahill is the younger brother of Bernie McCahill, a former All Black.

Rugby career
McCahill played for Sundays Well, Munster and won one cap for Ireland in 1995.

References

1968 births
Living people
Rugby union players from Auckland
People educated at St Peter's College, Auckland
New Zealand people of Irish descent
Ireland international rugby union players
Irish rugby union players
Sundays Well RFC players
Munster Rugby players
Rugby union centres